Renê Campos Pereira is a Brazilian paralympic rower. He competed in the men's single sculls at the 2020 Summer Paralympics, winning the bronze medal. Pereira also competed in the rowing at the 2016 Summer Paralympics.

References

External links 
Paralympic Games profile

Living people
Place of birth missing (living people)
Year of birth missing (living people)
Brazilian male rowers
Rowers at the 2016 Summer Paralympics
Rowers at the 2020 Summer Paralympics
Medalists at the 2020 Summer Paralympics
Paralympic medalists in rowing
Paralympic rowers of Brazil
Paralympic bronze medalists for Brazil
21st-century Brazilian people